The original incarnation of Viacom Inc. (derived from "Video & Audio Communications") was an American media conglomerate based in New York City. It began as CBS Television Film Sales, the broadcast syndication division of the CBS television network in 1952; it was renamed CBS Films in 1958, renamed CBS Enterprises in 1968, renamed Viacom in 1970, and spun off into its own company in 1971. Viacom was a distributor of CBS television series throughout the 1970s and 1980s, and also distributed syndicated television programs.

In 1999, Viacom acquired the parent company of CBS, the former Westinghouse Electric Corporation, which had been renamed CBS Corporation in 1997. Viacom was split into the second CBS Corporation and Viacom incarnations, and ceased operations in 2005. The spin-off was structured so that CBS Corporation would be the legal successor to the first Viacom, with the second Viacom being an entirely separated company. The two companies eventually re-merged in 2019, leading to the formation of ViacomCBS, now known as Paramount Global.

History 

Viacom originated on March 16, 1952 — when CBS founded its broadcast syndication division, CBS Television Film Sales. It renamed as CBS Films in October 1958. On December 1, 1967, it again renamed as CBS Enterprises Inc.. On July 6, 1970, it announced that CBS Enterprises would be spin out from its parent company, and the same month the division was incorporated as Viacom, and spun off on January 1, 1971, amid new FCC rules forbidding television networks from owning syndication companies (the rules were later repealed). 

In addition to CBS TV series syndication rights, Viacom also held cable systems with 90,000 cable subscribers, at that time the largest in the US. In 1976, Viacom started Showtime, a pay movie channel, with Warner-Amex taking a half-share ownership. The company went into original programming production starting in the late 1970s until the early 1980s with middling results.

Expansion through acquisitions 
Viacom's first broadcast station acquisition came in 1978 when the company purchased WHNB-TV in New Britain, Connecticut, changing its call letters to WVIT. Two years later Viacom added the Sonderling Broadcasting chain, giving it radio stations in New York City, Washington, D.C., Houston, and San Francisco, and one television station, WAST (now WNYT) in Albany, New York.

In 1983 Viacom purchased KSLA in Shreveport, Louisiana, and WHEC-TV in Rochester, New York, in separate transactions. This was followed in 1986 with CBS-owned KMOX-TV in St. Louis; with the purchase, that station's call letters were changed to KMOV.

Also in 1983, Viacom reacquired its premium channel Showtime, and later merged it with Warner-Amex's The Movie Channel forming Showtime/The Movie Channel, Inc.

Between the late 1980s and the early 1990s, Viacom syndicated several shows produced by Carsey-Werner Productions, namely The Cosby Show, A Different World and Roseanne.

In 1985, Viacom acquired Showtime/The Movie Channel, Inc. from Warner-Amex, ending the joint venture. Around the same time, Viacom bought MTV Networks, which owned MTV, VH-1, and Nickelodeon. This led to Viacom becoming a mass media company rather than simply a distribution company, and completed in 1986.

In 1986, movie theater owner National Amusements bought controlling interest in Viacom, which brought Sumner Redstone to the company.

In 1987, Viacom sought to expand its horizons by launching the new Viacom Network Enterprises division, which was led by Ronald C. Bernard, in order to develop and exploit properties outside of the core cable business and the company would ride herd on diverse enterprises as Viacom's pay-per-view venture, Viewer's Choice, Satellite Direct, Inc. and SMA TV, and handle strategic planning and new business development for Viacom Networks Group, and would develop merchandising, licensing and home video business around the two Viacom subsidiaries it was currently operating, Showtime-The Movie Channel, Inc. and MTV Networks.

Redstone retained the Viacom name and made a string of large acquisitions in the early 1990s, announcing plans to merge with Paramount Communications (formerly Gulf+Western), parent of Paramount Pictures, in 1993, and buying the Blockbuster Video chain in 1994. The acquisition of Paramount Communications on July 7, 1994 made Viacom one of the world's largest entertainment companies. Also in 1993, WTXX entered into a part-time local marketing agreement with Viacom's NBC station WVIT.

The Paramount and Blockbuster acquisitions gave Viacom access to large television holdings: An archive of programming controlled by Aaron Spelling's company which included, along with his own productions, the pre-1973 ABC and NBC libraries under Worldvision Enterprises and Republic Pictures; and an expanded group of television station properties which merged Viacom's five existing outlets into Paramount's seven-station group. Viacom used some of these stations to launch the UPN network, which started operations in January 1995 as a joint venture with Chris-Craft Industries. Shortly afterward, Viacom/Paramount spent the next two years selling off its non-UPN affiliated stations to various owners. In 1997, Viacom exited the broadcast radio business, albeit temporarily, when it sold the majority of its stations to Chancellor Media, a predecessor company of iHeartMedia.

In 1999, Viacom made its biggest acquisition to date by announcing plans to merge with its former parent CBS via the first CBS Corporation (the last name for Westinghouse Electric Corporation). The merger was completed in May 2000, bringing CBS Cable's channels TNN (now Paramount Network) and Country Music Television (CMT) under Viacom's MTV Networks wing, as well as CBS's production units and TV distributors Eyemark Entertainment (formerly Group W Productions) and King World under the main wing.

In 2001, Viacom completed its purchase of BET Holdings, the owners of the Black Entertainment Television (BET) network. As with CBS Cable, it was immediately integrated into MTV Networks, causing some outcry among BET workers in the Washington, D.C., area (where BET was based before the merger). As a result, BET was separated from MTV Networks, into a division known as BET Networks.

Although a majority economic interest in Viacom was held by independent shareholders, the Redstone family maintained 71-percent voting control of the company through National Amusements' holdings of Viacom's stock.

In 2002, Viacom's MTV Networks International bought independently run Dutch music video channel TMF, which at the time was broadcasting in Belgium and the Netherlands. In June 2004, MTVNI bought VIVA Media AG, the German equivalent to MTV. The same month, plans were announced to dispose of Viacom's interest in Blockbuster later that year by means of an exchange offer; the spinoff of Blockbuster was completed in October.

Also in 2002, Viacom acquired the remaining shares of Infinity Broadcasting radio chain, which resulted in Viacom's return to operating radio stations after it originally exited the broadcast radio business in 1997. In April 2003, Viacom acquired the remaining ownership shares of Comedy Central from then-AOL Time Warner, integrating Comedy Central into MTV Networks.

Viacom Cable 
From its formation until 1995, Viacom operated several cable television systems generally located in the Dayton, San Francisco, Nashville and Seattle metropolitan areas. Several of these were originally independent systems that CBS acquired in the 1960s. The division was known as Viacom Cablevision until the early 1990s, when it was renamed to Viacom Cable. By 1995, Viacom Cable had about 1.1 million subscribers. Viacom sold the division to TCI in 1995. Viacom's cable assets are now part of Comcast.

2005 split and 2019 re-merger 

In March 2005, the company announced plans of looking into splitting into two publicly traded companies under the continuing ownership of National Amusements because of a stagnating stock price. The internal rivalry between Les Moonves and Tom Freston, longtime heads of CBS and MTV Networks respectively, and the controversy of the Super Bowl XXXVIII halftime show, which resulted in MTV being banned from producing any more Super Bowl halftime shows, were also seen as factors. After the departure of Mel Karmazin in 2004, Redstone, who served as chairman and chief executive officer, decided to split the offices of president and chief operating officer between Moonves and Freston. Redstone was set to retire in the near future, and a split would be a creative solution to the matter of replacing him.

The split was approved by Viacom's board on June 14, 2005, and took effect on December 31 of that year, effectively reversing the Viacom-CBS merger of 2000. The existing Viacom was renamed CBS Corporation (thus restoring its pre-merger name) and was headed by Moonves. It was intended to consist of Viacom's slower-growing businesses, which included CBS, UPN (which merged with The WB to form The CW), CBS Radio (since sold to Entercom on November 17, 2017), Simon & Schuster, Viacom Outdoor (which was renamed CBS Outdoor before being spun off as Outfront Media), Showtime Networks, and Paramount Pictures' original television division (now known as CBS Studios). In addition, CBS Corporation was given Paramount Parks, which it later sold to amusement park operator Cedar Fair on June 30, 2006, and the CBS College Sports Network, now known as CBS Sports Network. 

Additionally, a spun-off company was created that took the Viacom name, which was headed by Freston. It comprised MTV Networks, BET Networks, Paramount Pictures, and Paramount Pictures' home entertainment operations. These businesses were categorized as the high-growth businesses. 

The second iterations of CBS Corporation and Viacom began trading on January 3, 2006. National Amusements continued to be the controlling shareholder of the two companies formed after the split. In September 2006, Redstone fired Freston and named Philippe Dauman as the head of Viacom.

On August 13, 2019, CBS and Viacom officially announced their re-merger deal; the combined company would be called ViacomCBS, with Bob Bakish as president and CEO and Shari Redstone as the chairwoman of the new company. On December 4, 2019, the deal was completed.

Former Viacom-owned stations 
Stations are arranged alphabetically by state and community of license.

Radio stations 
Notes:
 Two boldface asterisks appearing following a station's call letters (**) indicate a station that was purchased from Sonderling Broadcasting in 1980, which initiated Viacom's entry into radio station ownership (WAST television in Albany was also purchased through the Sonderling deal);
 This list does not include stations owned by CBS Radio and its predecessors, Westinghouse Broadcasting and Infinity Broadcasting which were acquired by Viacom through its merger with CBS in 2000.

Television stations 
 This list does not include other stations owned by Paramount Stations Group which were acquired by Viacom through its acquisition of Paramount Pictures in 1994, nor any other station purchased by Viacom/Paramount following the Paramount acquisition and prior to its merger with CBS in 2000.

 1 WTXX was owned by Counterpoint Communications, but Viacom operated the station through a part-time local marketing agreement.

Notes

References 

1952 establishments in New York City
2006 disestablishments in New York (state)
Predecessors of Paramount Global
Conglomerate companies established in 1952
Conglomerate companies disestablished in 2006
Defunct mass media companies of the United States
Television syndication distributors
American companies established in 1952
American companies disestablished in 2006
Mass media companies established in 1952
Mass media companies disestablished in 2006
Mass media companies of the United States
Mass media companies based in New York City
Defunct companies based in New York City